Rebecca Jones (born Rebecca Jones Fuentes Berain on May 21, 1957) is a Mexican-American  actress. She was married for 25 years to actor Alejandro Camacho with whom she worked sharing credits in many telenovelas such as: El angel caido, Cuna de lobos, Imperio de Cristal, Para volver a amar and Que te perdone Dios. Together they have a son named Maximiliano Camacho Jones.

Career

Beginnings as an actress and scope in the theater 
Jones is the daughter of a father from the United States and a Mexican mother, who moved to California, United States, when she was very small where she studied. After completing high school and the Dramatic Arts career, in addition to courses related to acting, literary analysis, scenography, lighting and make-up, she studied in Laguna Beach High School at Saddleback College, the South Coast Actors Corporation and the University of Southern California. In 1981, after several experiences and working as a waitress, she returned to Mexico, and two years later, she began her debut as an actress, with the work El coleccionista (1983), for this performance she received several awards, among which the award for the Revelation of the Year by the Union of Critics and Theatrical Chronicles. In the theater field, his work in works such as La visita de la bestia, Pelearán a 10 rounds, Víctimas del amor, La declaración, Casémonos juntos, El sexo opuesto, Drácula, Cómo aprendí a manejar and Rosa de dos aromas.

Filmography

Films

Television

As writer and producer

Awards and nominations

References

External links

1957 births
Living people
Mexican film actresses
Mexican telenovela actresses
Mexican television actresses
Mexican telenovela producers
Mexican people of American descent
Actresses from Mexico City
20th-century Mexican actresses
21st-century Mexican actresses
People from Mexico City
Women television producers